Work in Progress is the second full-length album by Israeli punk rock band Man Alive, released independently in 2002 via Sterile Records. Due to the success of the album, it was re-released in the same year via Dying Is Deadly.

The album was self-produced, recorded and mixed by the band at band members' Jamie and Joel Hilsden house at the Galilee, Israel.

Track listing
 "Zeal" – 2:02
 "Maybe I'm Crazy" – 3:26
 "Over You" – 2:04
 "A Million People" – 3:20
 "Work in Progress" – 4:02
 "Bleeding" – 3:13
 "Here to Stay" – 2:30
 "Last Words" – 0:19
 "Trying to Pretend" – 2:35
 "Reminder" – 4:17

Personnel
 Jamie Hilsden (lead vocals, guitar)
 David Shkedi (lead guitar, vocals)
 Jon Shkedi (bass, vocals)
 Joel Hilsden (drums)

2002 albums
Man Alive (band) albums